Jean-François de Gondi (1584 – 21 March 1654) was the first archbishop of Paris, from 1622 to 1654.

He was the son of Albert de Gondi and Claude Catherine de Clermont. He was a member of the Gondi family, which had held the bishopric of Paris for nearly a century, and would continue to do so after him. Jean-François succeeded his brother Henri de Gondi. Henri had himself succeeded his uncle Pierre de Gondi (1533–1616), cardinal and commendatory abbot of the abbeys of Saint-Aubin-d'Angers, La Chaume, Sainte-Croix de Quimperlé and Buzay.

He refused his blessing to the Company of the Blessed Sacrament, even though Louis XIII wrote him a personal letter in 1631 requesting him to do so.

Following his death in Paris, he was succeeded by his nephew Jean-François Paul de Gondi, cardinal of Retz.

Notes and references

Archbishops of Paris
17th-century Roman Catholic archbishops in France
1584 births
1654 deaths
Burials at Notre-Dame de Paris